Boyer Run is a  long 2nd order tributary to Sewickley Creek in Westmoreland County, Pennsylvania.

Course

Watershed

References

 
Tributaries of the Ohio River
Rivers of Pennsylvania
Rivers of Westmoreland County, Pennsylvania
Allegheny Plateau